Avendale Athletico is a South African football club from Cape Town.

They were relegated from the National First Division in 2004/2005.

Achievements

National First Division –  Coastal Stream: Runner-up 1998/99, 1999/00, 2001/02, 2003/04

Sport in Cape Town
Soccer clubs in South Africa